AMB-CHMINACA or MMB-CHMINACA (also known as MA-CHMINACA) is an indazole-based synthetic cannabinoid that is a potent agonist of the CB1 receptor and has been sold online as a designer drug.

Legal status
AMB-CHMINACA is listed in the Fifth Schedule of the Misuse of Drugs Act (MDA) and therefore illegal in Singapore as of May 2015.

Sweden's public health agency classified AMB-CHMINACA as a narcotic substance, on January 18, 2019.

See also 

 5F-AB-PINACA
 5F-ADB
 5F-AMB
 5F-APINACA
 AB-CHFUPYCA
 AB-FUBINACA
 AB-PINACA
 ADB-CHMINACA
 ADB-FUBINACA
 ADB-PINACA
 ADSB-FUB-187
 AMB-FUBINACA
 APINACA
 MDMB-CHMICA
 MDMB-CHMINACA
 MDMB-FUBINACA
 PX-2
 PX-3

References 

Cannabinoids
Designer drugs
Indazolecarboxamides